The Wolfe Tones Gaelic Football Club was founded in 1957 and first took the field in the summer of 1958.  While not the oldest Gaelic Football club in Chicago, the Wolfe Tones is one of the most successful clubs in North America with 22 senior Chicago titles and 13 North American Championships and competing in 17 NCAB finals.

Wolfe Tones History

The Tones won their first American League Title in 1978. Nicknamed "The Blue Machine," they drew players from all counties which was an advantage and in the seventies and eighties were mostly home-based with strong social ties because everyone worked and socialised together.

In the mid-1980s, the club added a Junior team, while the Juniors have not had the same level of success as the Senior team, it has still added to the level of support that the club enjoys and allows many younger Irish-Americans to participate in the rich culture of the GAA.  In the late 1990s and early 2000s Mike Mulligan, then of the Chicago Sun Times, wrote that the Wolfe Tones were "a Chicago-based Gaelic football powerhouse."

In past years, the Wolfe Tones main rivals have been the McBrides GFC and the St. Brendan's GFC  and, more recently, the Parnell's GFC.

Due to the economic downturn and changes in US Immigration law, GAA clubs in North America have come upon hard times.  Despite this, the Wolfe Tones still have been able to field competitive teams.

Wolfe Tones Players 

The Wolfe Tones have always fielded competitive teams and have drawn from some of the most famous and skilled Gaelic Football players from nearly every county in Ireland, going so far as to play in the GAA Golf Tournament. They have also played several challenge games in Ireland

Here are just a few of the county players that have played for the Tones through the years;

2012 Chicago Finals Champions 

The 2012 Wolfe Tones won their divisional title in Chicago, but lost to the Ulster GFC of San Francisco in their Semi-Final Match at the NACB Finals in Philadelphia.

Senior Title Years 

Through the years, the Wolfe Tones have enjoyed successes through the years in the North American County Board, having won titles for both their division and in the county. Here is the list of the Senior Titles of the North American GAA the club has won through the years.

Stubs

References

Wolfe Tones
Gaelic football clubs in the United States
Sports clubs established in 1957
1957 establishments in Illinois